Millbrook Township may refer to the following places in the United States:

 Millbrook Township, Peoria County, Illinois
 Millbrook Township, Graham County, Kansas
 Millbrook Township, Michigan

See also: Millbrook (disambiguation)

Township name disambiguation pages